The Fayetteville Generals were a minor league baseball team located in Fayetteville, North Carolina.

The last minor league baseball team to play before the Generals were the Fayetteville Highlanders of the Carolina League, they ceased play after the 1956 season.

In 1986, Charles Padgett, a Don Koonce and Jimmy O. Bunce paid $500,000 for the franchise. 
The team struggled financially until the 1989 season and posted several positive years financially and with attendance through the early 1990s.  

They were part of the South Atlantic League between 1986 and 1996. They were affiliated with the Detroit Tigers throughout their entire existence. Prior to the 1997 season, the Generals were renamed the Cape Fear Crocs.

In 1996, playing with the Generals, Gabe Kapler led the South Atlantic League in hits, doubles, and triples (45; 2nd in the minor leagues), extra-base hits (71), and total bases (280).

Year-by-year record

Notable former players

Gabe Kapler, outfielder
Travis Fryman, infielder
Frank Catalanotto, infielder
Juan Encarnación, outfielder

References

Defunct South Atlantic League teams
Baseball teams established in 1987
Sports in Fayetteville, North Carolina
Sports clubs disestablished in 1996
1987 establishments in North Carolina
1996 disestablishments in North Carolina
Professional baseball teams in North Carolina
Defunct baseball teams in North Carolina